Machine Head is the sixth studio album released by the English rock band Deep Purple. It was recorded in December 1971 at Montreux, Switzerland, and released on 25 March 1972 on Purple Records.

As previous recording sessions had been slotted into the group's gigging schedule, Deep Purple wanted to dedicate time to record an album away from the typical studio environment, hoping it would result in a sound closer to their live shows. They hired the Rolling Stones Mobile Studio for recording, and block-booked the Montreux Casino as a venue, but during a Frank Zappa concert immediately before the sessions, the casino burned to the ground. After a week of searching for an alternative venue, including a session at a nearby theatre that was abandoned due to noise complaints, the band managed to book the Grand Hotel, closed for the winter, and converted it into a live room suitable for recording. These events, particularly the casino fire, became the inspiration for the song "Smoke on the Water".

Machine Head is Deep Purple's most commercially successful album, topping the charts in several countries, including number one in the UK. Influential in the development of traditional metal, it continues to be viewed favourably by music critics and has been reissued several times.

Background
By 1971, Deep Purple had been touring for two years and earlier studio albums, such as Deep Purple in Rock (1970) and Fireball (1971) were recorded in between live shows. The band felt that prior studio work did not sound as good as their live performances, and wanted to record in a stage environment. Drummer Ian Paice recorded his kit in the corridor for some of the Fireball sessions, believing it sounded better, and he wanted to find an alternative recording environment away from a typical sound-proofed studio. Deep Purple were advised to record outside the United Kingdom, as they would not have to pay as much income tax.

The group toured the UK from September to October 1971, and previewed some new material that was ultimately released on Machine Head. They then began a tour of the United States, which ended up being cancelled after two gigs due to singer Ian Gillan contracting hepatitis. Guitarist Ritchie Blackmore started to think about possible solo work for the future, and Deep Purple as a whole looked forward to a dedicated block of time to record, getting away from the pressures of touring.

Deep Purple initially planned to record Machine Head at Montreux Casino in Switzerland during December 1971. They had booked the Rolling Stones Mobile Studio and made hotel reservations. The casino was a large arena, containing several entertainment facilities. The band had performed there in May 1971, and befriended Claude Nobs, founder and general manager of the Montreux Jazz Festival. Among others, Led Zeppelin, Pink Floyd, and Black Sabbath had all performed at the casino, and it closed for refurbishments each winter, allowing it to be used as a recording venue. Deep Purple arrived there on 3 December 1971. After a final concert, they would have the location to themselves. In return, the band tentatively proposed to perform a show at the casino, which would have allowed them to release a double album, half live and half studio.

Recording

The last gig at Montreux Casino was a matinée performance by Frank Zappa and the Mothers of Invention. At the time, the group included singers Flo & Eddie, multi-instrumentalist Ian Underwood and drummer Aynsley Dunbar. During the show, a member of the audience fired a flare into the building's roof. Although the audience were initially unaware of the incident because the roof was covered by a false bamboo ceiling, about an hour into the set, people started seeing sparks emerging. The group stopped playing; according to bassist Roger Glover, Zappa said that "no-one should panic, but ..... FIRE!" After this, management ordered a controlled evacuation. There were no fatalities, but a group were briefly trapped in the casino's basement before being rescued by Nobs. Shortly after everyone had been safely evacuated, the building went up in flames.

Nobs relocated Deep Purple to the Pavilion, a nearby theatre, where they recorded the basic tracks for a song provisionally named "Title No. 1". Glover recalled waking up one morning saying the title "Smoke on the Water" out loud. From this, Gillan wrote the lyrics which describe the experience in Montreux. A photograph of the burning Montreux Casino was included in the album's gatefold cover.

The Pavilion proved to be impractical to record in, as nearby residents complained to the police about the noise. Although roadies tried to prevent the police entering by holding the doors shut, the band were quickly evicted. They searched for other recording locations and settled with the empty Grand Hotel, on the edge of Montreux. With the mobile unit parked at the main entrance, Deep Purple set up at the end of a corridor off the main lobby where the hallway came to a "T". An assortment of equipment and sound-insulating mattresses were installed, which meant the band had to walk through bedrooms and across balconies to get to the recording van. This proved so arduous that Deep Purple stopped listening to playbacks of their recordings, instead performing until they were satisfied. A closed-circuit television system was set up so the band could communicate with engineer Martin Birch and allow staff in the studio control room to see them.

Songs

The opening track, "Highway Star" was written while the group were on a coach travelling to their opening UK tour date in Portsmouth on 13 September 1971. The band's management arranged for them to travel to the gig with a group of music journalists who could interview the band at their leisure. One of them asked Blackmore how he wrote songs, upon which he said, "like this", picked up the guitar and played the song's opening riff. Gillan improvised a set of lyrics around: "We're on the road, we're a rock'n'roll band". The rest of the band completed the arrangement during rehearsals and it was added to the show on the evening of the gig. Blackmore based his guitar solo around a figure that he learned from Johnny Burnette, and liked its resemblance to Johann Sebastian Bach.

"Maybe I'm A Leo" went under the working title of "One Just Before Midnight", which appears in a picture of a recording sheet on the album sleeve. The finished title and lyrics refer to Gillan's birth sign. Glover wrote the song's main riff after listening to John Lennon's "How Do You Sleep?", and he liked that the riff did not start on the first beat of the bar. The song was played live once in 1972 at a BBC In Concert performance. It became a live favourite years later, after Joe Satriani temporarily joined the band in 1993.

"Pictures of Home" describes the sights and images of the local area around Montreux, far away from home. The track was initially recorded with a drum introduction, which was left off the original recording; however, it was added for the 25th anniversary reissue. The track was also played live after Satriani joined Deep Purple. "Never Before" was considered by the band to be the most commercial track on the album, and was released as a single. The song was played live once at the BBC In Concert show.

"Smoke on the Water" documents the experiences of recording Machine Head, including the casino fire and evacuation, and the sessions at the Grand Hotel. The title referred to thick black smoke from the fire hanging over the shore of Lake Geneva. The backing track was the only usable material that came from the Pavilion recordings, before police shut the sessions down. Blackmore contributed the opening guitar riff, and later said it was popular due to being simple and based around four notes, comparing it to the opening musical phrasing of Beethoven's Fifth Symphony. Although the track is the most famous by Deep Purple, and one of the most famous in rock music in general, the band did not think it had much commercial potential, and it was one of the last of the tracks from Machine Head to be played live. The song was subsequently a major chart hit in the US, reaching number four on the Billboard Hot 100. As well as Deep Purple, Gillan has performed the song live as part of his solo career, and during his brief time with Black Sabbath in 1983.

"Lazy" was first played live during the 1971 UK tour, and retained throughout the following year. It was performed towards the end of the live show, replacing the instrumental workout "Wring That Neck", and was later moved mid-set in early 1972. Glover said the song was roughly based on an Oscar Brown song, "Sleepy", while Blackmore stated it was inspired by Eric Clapton's "Stepping Out". The song was designed to be a vehicle for various instrumental showcases, including an unaccompanied organ introduction and Gillan's harmonica. Blackmore recorded the guitar solos in sections on two different days, which were then joined.

"Space Truckin'" was written as a pastiche of 1950s rock 'n' roll lyrics, but with a science fiction theme. Deep Purple began thinking of nonsense phrases such as "music in our solar system" that would fit. Paice played a short drum solo on the track. It was first played live in January 1972 at the next gig following the Montreux sessions, and led into the instrumental section of the earlier live showcase "Mandrake Root" as the closing number. The song remained the last number in the set after Gillan and Glover left the band in 1973, including a memorable performance at the California Jam the following year, where Blackmore set fire to his amplifiers and destroyed a TV camera with his guitar. The song was regularly played as a wakeup call by the crew on board the Space Shuttle program flight STS-107 in 2003.

A ballad entitled "When a Blind Man Cries" was recorded during the Machine Head sessions, but was not included on the album. Instead, it was used as the B-side on the "Never Before" single. The song appears as a bonus track on the 25th anniversary edition of Machine Head.

Release and artwork
The album was released in the UK on 25 March 1972. A US tour for March and April that year was postponed after Blackmore fell ill. The first shows in the UK, promoting the album were at the Rainbow Theatre in June 1972. Two months later, the band toured Japan for the first time, recordings of which become the double live album Made in Japan. Four songs from Machine Head ("Highway Star", "Smoke on the Water", "Lazy" and "Space Truckin'") were included in the album.

The cover art was created by stamping the album title into a polished metal sheet, which was held up to act as a mirror in front of which the group stood. The photographer Shepard Sherbell then took a picture of the reflection; a small trace of him can be made out on the finished picture (just below the "Head" text). The album's inner sleeve was mostly designed by Glover and manager Tony Edwards, and features a selection of mug shots that were previously used for record company contact sheets. It included a picture of Nobs, to whom Machine Head was dedicated. The initial pressings also had a hand-printed lyric sheet.

Critical reception

Machine Head reached number one on the UK Albums Chart within seven days of its release, remaining there for two weeks before returning in May 1972 for a further week. In the US, during its initial release in 1972, the album reached number 34; the album then peaked at number 7 in 1973 when "Smoke on the Water" became a hit, and Machine Head remained on the Billboard charts for over two years. The first single released from the album, "Never Before", reached number 35 in the UK and did not chart in the US. Prompted by heavy radio play of "Smoke on the Water" as an album cut, Warner Brothers eventually released it as a single in May 1973. The song reached number two on the Canadian RPM chart and number four on the US Billboard Hot 100.

The album was met with positive reviews from critics. Rolling Stone's Lester Bangs praised the lyrics to "Highway Star" and "Space Truckin'" as well as all the music, although he was less complimentary about the lyrics of the remaining songs: "In between those two Deep Purple classics lies nothing but good, hard-socking music, although some of the lyrics may leave a bit to be desired." Concluding his review, he admitted: "I do know that this very banality is half the fun of rock 'n' roll. And I am confident that I will love the next five Deep Purple albums madly so long as they sound exactly like these last three." Robert Christgau wrote of the album: "I approve of their speeding, and Ritchie Blackmore has copped some self-discipline as well as a few suspicious-sounding licks from his buddies in London." AllMusic critic Eduardo Rivadavia called Machine Head "one of the essential hard rock albums of all time."

Blackmore noted that Machine Head was recorded in about three weeks, remarking that "everything was natural and it all worked." He further stated, "I didn't like Fireball very much because we were just working too much. But we had about a month off before Machine Head, which allowed me to get my head together and write some stuff." On the 50th anniversary of Machine Head in 2022, Ian Gillan remarked, "It was a milestone for sure because it took us two albums to get there. It took In Rock and Fireball to reach Machine Head. Machine Head is a slightly more refined version of those earthier ones. It's a historical album, and we're still doing 'Highway Star,' we still do 'Pictures of Home,' which are actually the two opening tracks in our live set right now. And of course, we still do 'Smoke on the Water,' which always goes down a treat."

Kerrang! magazine ranked Machine Head at number 35 on their "100 Greatest Heavy Metal Albums of All Time" list in 1989. In an Observer Music Monthly Greatest British Albums poll, Ozzy Osbourne chose the album as one of his 10 favourite British records of all time. Machine Head became the subject of one of the Classic Albums series of documentaries about the making of famous albums. In 2001, Machine Head was mentioned in Qs "50 Heaviest Albums of All Time", while in 2007, it featured in The Guardians 2007 edition of 1000 Albums to Hear Before You Die. Based on its appearances in professional rankings and listings, the aggregate website Acclaimed Music lists Machine Head as 9th most acclaimed album of 1972, the 99th most acclaimed album of the 1970s and the 337th most acclaimed album in history.

Reissues
The album was released on the multichannel formats DVD-Audio (2001), in a new 5.1 channel mix and Super Audio CD (SACD) (2003) with the European quadraphonic mix. It was later released via SACD on 17 August 2011, through Warner Music Group in the Warner Premium Sound series of the label, which has the same 5.1 channel mix as the 2001 DVD-Audio version.

The 40th anniversary edition of Machine Head was released in October 2012 by EMI; this is a five-disc set, accompanied by an illustrated 60-page hardback booklet. Its contents include: Original album 2012 remaster (CD1), Roger Glover's 1997 mixes (CD2), Original album quad SQ stereo (2012 remaster) (CD3), In Concert '72 from Paris Theatre, London, 9 March 1972 – 2012 mix (CD4), 2012 high-resolution remaster and surround mixes (DVD, audio only). To celebrate the 40th anniversary, a tribute album Re-Machined: A Tribute to Deep Purple's Machine Head was released in September 2012, through Eagle Rock Entertainment.

Track listing

Original vinyl release

25th anniversary edition

40th anniversary edition

The later standalone CD edition of "In Concert '72" added a soundcheck recording of "Maybe I'm a Leo" (4:32).

Personnel 
Deep Purple
 Ritchie Blackmore – guitar
 Ian Gillan – vocals, harmonica
 Roger Glover – bass
 Jon Lord – keyboards, Hammond organ
 Ian Paice – drums, percussion

Production
 Martin Birch – engineering, mixing with Deep Purple
 Jeremy "Bear" Gee – assistant engineer
 Nick Watterton – technician, Rolling Stones Mobile Studio operator
 Ian Hansford, Rob Cooksey, Colin Hart – equipment technicians
 Shephard Sherbell – photography
 Roger Glover and John Coletta – cover design
 Peter Denenberg and Roger Glover – remixing (1997)
 Peter Mew – remastering at Abbey Road Studios, London (1997)

Charts

Year-end charts

Certifications and sales

Accolades

References 

Bibliography

Deep Purple albums
EMI Records albums
1972 albums
Warner Records albums
Purple Records albums